is a former Japanese football player and manager.

Playing career
Azuma was born in Tokushima on September 21, 1967. After graduating from high school, he played for Toyota Motors from 1986 to 1992.

Coaching career
After retirement, in 1995, Azuma became a coach at his local club Otsuka Pharmaceutical (later Tokushima Vortis). In September 2006, he was promoted to a manager as Shinji Tanaka successor. End of season, he resigned.

Club statistics

Managerial statistics

References

External links

1967 births
Living people
People from Tokushima (city)
Association football people from Tokushima Prefecture
Japanese footballers
Japan Soccer League players
Nagoya Grampus players
Japanese football managers
J2 League managers
Tokushima Vortis managers
Association football midfielders